The Shriners Children's Open is a golf tournament on the PGA Tour in Nevada. Founded  in 1983, it is the fourth event of the Tour's 2019–20 wrap-around season and is played annually in October in Las Vegas.

Known by various titles,  it was originally played over five rounds (90 holes) over several other courses. When created in 1983, it had the highest purse on tour at $750,000. Tiger Woods recorded his first PGA Tour victory at Las Vegas in October 1996, in a playoff over 1993 champion Davis Love III. The format was changed to 72 holes in 2004.

In 2007 the tournament announced that the Shriners Hospitals for Children would take over the operations of the tournament and that the Las Vegas Founders, a volunteer group, would no longer be involved with the event. The following year Fry's Electronics, chief presenting sponsor in 2006 and 2007, ended their association with the event, choosing to concentrate on a second tournament in Arizona that it was already sponsoring. Entertainer Justin Timberlake was the host of the tournament for five years, 2008 through 2012. Timberlake, an avid golfer who plays to a 6 handicap, played in the celebrity pro-am and hosted a benefit concert during the week of the tournament.

The inaugural tournament in 1983 had a then-record official purse of $750,000 and Fuzzy Zoeller took the $135,000 winner's share at Las Vegas Country Club in mid-September. In 1984, it became the first PGA Tour event in history to offer a purse exceeding a million dollars: champion Denis Watson won $162,000 from a prize pool of $1,122,500. The tourney moved to late March in 1985, to early May in 1986, then to mid-October in 1990. A tradition at the tournament is presenting the trophy to the champion while two showgirls are a part of the pomp and circumstance.

In its history, the Las Vegas event has been hosted by numerous courses before settling at its current venue, TPC Summerlin.  Past venues include TPC at the Canyons (now TPC Las Vegas), Bear's Best Golf Club, Southern Highlands Golf Club, Desert Inn Country Club (now the Wynn Golf & Country Club), Las Vegas Country Club, Las Vegas Hilton Country Club (now Las Vegas National Golf Club), Sunrise Golf Club, Spanish Trail Golf & Country Club, Showboat Country Club (now Wildhorse Golf Club), Dunes Country Club and Stallion Mountain Golf Club. Several of these courses are no longer operational.

Three players have won multiple titles in Las Vegas. Jim Furyk won three times in the 1990s. Kevin Na has won twice, in 2011 and 2019. And Martin Laird won in 2009 and 2020.

In the 2010 tournament, Jonathan Byrd made a hole in one on the fourth hole of a three-man sudden-death playoff to win.

Course layout

Source:

Winners

Note: Green highlight indicates scoring records.
Sources:

Tournament record scores

Five round tournament
The first 21 events (1983–2003) were scheduled for 90 holes.
Aggregate
328 Scott McCarron (2003)
328 Stuart Appleby (2003)
To-par
−31 Andrew Magee (1991)
−31 D. A. Weibring (1991)
−31 Scott McCarron (2003)
−31 Stuart Appleby (2003)

Four round tournament
The event switched to a 72-hole format in 2004.
Aggregate
260 Ryan Moore (2012)
260 Webb Simpson (2013)
To-par
−25 Marc Turnesa (2008)

Notes

References

External links
Coverage on the PGA Tour's official site

PGA Tour events
Golf in Las Vegas
Recurring sporting events established in 1983
1983 establishments in Nevada
Open